Chelostoma rapunculi is a species of bee in the family Megachilidae. It is found in Europe and Northern Asia (excluding China) and North America.

References

Further reading

External links

 

Megachilidae
Articles created by Qbugbot
Insects described in 1841